Bongumusa Sibonelo Makhanya (born 7 March 1996) is a South African cricketer. He was part of South Africa U19 team for the 2014 ICC Under-19 Cricket World Cup. He was included in the KwaZulu-Natal cricket team squad for the 2015 Africa T20 Cup. In August 2017, he was named in Nelson Mandela Bay Stars' squad for the first season of the T20 Global League. However, in October 2017, Cricket South Africa initially postponed the tournament until November 2018, with it being cancelled soon after.

In October 2018, Makhanya was named in Cape Town Blitz's squad for the first edition of the Mzansi Super League T20 tournament. In September 2019, he was named in the squad for the Paarl Rocks team for the 2019 Mzansi Super League tournament. In April 2021, he was named in Northerns' squad, ahead of the 2021–22 cricket season in South Africa.

References

External links
 

1996 births
Living people
Cricketers from Durban
South African cricketers
KwaZulu-Natal cricketers
Dolphins cricketers
Cape Town Blitz cricketers
Paarl Rocks cricketers
Titans cricketers
Northerns cricketers